Ayoub Tabet (1884 – 14 February 1947) was a Lebanese Protestant politician.

Career
Tabet was the acting president of Lebanon during the French Mandate of Lebanon from 18 March to 22 July 1943 replacing President Alfred Naqqache and Prime Minister of Lebanon for the same period. He was also the acting prime minister (30 January 1936 - 5 January 1937).

He was also the secretary of the "Beirut Reform Movement," which had Salim Ali Salam and Petro Trad as its executive officers.

See also
 Protestantism in Lebanon

References

|-

|-

1884 births
1947 deaths
Lebanese Protestants
Lebanon under French rule
Presidents of Lebanon
Prime Ministers of Lebanon
Interior ministers of Lebanon